This is a list of Irish theatres and theatre companies past and present.  It includes organizations of both the Republic of Ireland and Northern Ireland.

See also

 Architecture of Ireland
 Irish theatre
 List of Irish dramatists

References 

Theatre
Theatres
Ireland

Lists of buildings and structures in Ireland